The Immigrant is a 1990 Iranian film by the director Ebrahim Hatamikia. The movie is set in the Mesopotamian Marshes during the Iran Iraq war, and is a fictional look at the deployment of the early generation of Qods Mohajer drone fighters on the battlefield. The movie was a critical success upon its release in 1990, and won the Crystal Simorgh award for best film (one of five Hatamikia films to win that award). Today, The Immigrant is seen as a milestone in the development of the Iranian film genre known as Sacred Defense cinema.

Cast 
 Seyed Ali Reza Khatami - Asad
 Seyed Ebrahim Asgharzadeh - Mahmoud
 Ali Reza Heydari - Ghafour
 Asghar Naghizadeh - The Guide
 Gholamreza Ali Akbari - Raoufi

References

External links 
 
 

1990 films
Films directed by Ebrahim Hatamikia
Iran–Iraq War films
1990s war drama films
Iranian war drama films
1990 drama films
Crystal Simorgh for Best Film winners